"Seven Cities" is a musical single by Solarstone released in 1999 written and produced by Rich Mowatt and Andy Bury. The single is considered to be a Balearic trance anthem. The vocals for the 2002 re-release were co-written and performed by Elizabeth Fields. The original version contains a sample of a vocal by Miriam Stockley from the track Tintinnabulum by Adiemus.

The track has been remixed by Armin van Buuren and other notable producers. The original 'Atlantis Mix' reached number #39 in the UK Singles Chart in 1999. The Armin van Buuren remix reached #44 in 2002, and was later ranked #87 in the A State of Trance Top 1000 in 2021.

Remixes
Armin van Buuren Remix
V-One's "Living Cities" Remix
Atlantis Mix
Michael Woods Remix
Katcha Remix
Solarstone's Ambient Dub Mix
Tom Colontonio Remix
Solarstone Pure Mix
Antillas and Dankann Remix
Thomas Datt Remix
Almar Remix
Darren Porter Refresh
Tom Staar Remix
Chris Schweizer Remix
Ferry Tayle Remix

Single
UK Single
"Seven Cities (Solar Stone's Atlantis Edit)" – 3:31
"Seven Cities (V - One's 'Living Cities' Remix)" – 8:38
"Seven Cities (Solar Stone's Costal Mix)" – 7:27

Notes

1999 singles
Solarstone songs
1999 songs